Asyncritus of Hyrcania, also Asynkritos (meaning "incomparable"), was numbered among the Seventy Disciples. He was bishop of Hyrcania in Asia. Saint Paul mentions him in his letter to the Romans (cf. 16:14).  The Church remembers St. Asyncritus on April 8.

Hymns
Troparion (Tone 1)  

Let us praise in hymns the six–fold choir of Apostles:
Herodion and Agabus,
Rufus, Asyncritus, Phlegon and holy Hermes.
They ever entreat the Trinity for our souls!

Kontakion (Tone 2)

You became the disciples of Christ
And all-holy Apostles,
O glorious Herodion, Agabus and Rufus,
Asyncritus, Phlegon and Hermes.
Ever entreat the Lord
To grant forgiveness of transgressions
To us who sing your praises.

Kontakion (Tone 4)

Like stars, O holy Apostles,
You illumine the way of the faithful with the light of the Holy Spirit.
You dispel the darkness of error as you gaze on God the Word!

Sources 
St. Nikolai Velimirovic, The Prologue from Ohrid

References

External links
Apostle Asyncritus of the Seventy, January 4 (OCA)
Apostle Asyncritus, of the Seventy and those with him, April 8 (OCA)
Agavos, Rouphos, Asynkritos, Phlegon, Herodion, & Hermes of the 70 Apostles (GOARCH)
 http://www.zeno.org/Heiligenlexikon-1858/A/Asyncritus,+S.+(1)
 http://www.biblia.deon.pl/rozdzial.php?id=285&werset=14#W14

Seventy disciples
1st-century bishops in Roman Anatolia
Persian saints
People in the Pauline epistles